Pablo Arias Echeverría (born 30 June 1970 in Madrid) is a Spanish politician of the People's Party who has served as a Member of the European Parliament from 2009 to 2014 and since 2019.

Political career
From 2000 to 2002 Arias Echeverría was assistant to Alejandro Agag, who served as Secretary General of the Christian Democratic International in Brussels at the time. In 2002, Arias worked as assistant to Prime Minister José María Aznar of Spain. After the Spanish parliamentary elections in 2004, in which Aznar was voted out of office as Prime Minister, Arias remained his office manager. From 2008 to 2009 he also held a management position at IESE Business School.

Throughout his time in parliament, Arias Echeverría has been serving on the Committee on the Internal Market and Consumer Protection. In addition to his committee assignments, he is part of the parliament's delegation for relations with the United States.

Sources
European Parliament profile

References

1970 births
Living people
Politicians from Madrid
People's Party (Spain) MEPs
MEPs for Spain 2009–2014
MEPs for Spain 2019–2024